Randy Martin (5 October 1957 – 28 January, 2015) was a professor of Art and Policy at New York University's Tisch School of the Arts, socialist activist, and dancer.

Thought
Educated as a sociologist but with a background as a dancer, Martin's scholarship addresses intersections between art and politics. In Financialization of Daily Life, Martin examines how the shift toward financialization in the economy of the United States has subsequently affected culture, with a particular attention paid to the control of inflation and stimulation of economic growth.

Bibliography

References

External links

Randi Martin Mahomes bio

1957 births
2015 deaths
American socialists
Tisch School of the Arts faculty
American male dancers
Graduate Center, CUNY alumni
Educators from New York City